FIQ Development Center, also known as FIQ, was an Iranian internet-based financial consulting. FIQ provided consulting services in stock exchange, forex, gold and commodity markets and offered learning courses in financial analysis. It also published an investment bulletin which called TAHLIL and had more than 1000 subscribers. The word FIQ Stands for Financial Intelligence Quotient because of the mission of the company to increase financial intelligence of its users. FIQ ceased its operations in 2014.

References
 

Financial services companies of Iran